Julia Ransom (born 4 February 1993) is a Canadian retired biathlete from Penticton, British Columbia. She competed in the 2013/14 and 2014/15 World Cup seasons, and represented Canada at the Biathlon World Championships 2015 in Kontiolahti.

Career

2018 Winter Olympics
In January 2018, Ransom was named to Canada's 2018 Olympic team where she finished 40th in the women's sprint.

References

1993 births
Living people
Canadian female biathletes
Olympic biathletes of Canada
Biathletes at the 2018 Winter Olympics
Sportspeople from Penticton